Kwadjo Anani (born 13 December 1999) is a Ghanaian judoka.

He was born in Brescia, Italy to Ghanaian parents, and has dual Italian and Ghanaian citizenship.
Now he live in cavriana a smallest country in mantua 
At the 2021 African Judo Championships held in Dakar, Senegal, he won the silver medal in his event.

He was selected to compete at the 2020 Summer Games and drawn against Gwak Dong-han in the first round.

References

External links
 

1999 births
Living people
Ghanaian male judoka
Italian male judoka
Olympic judoka of Ghana
Judoka at the 2020 Summer Olympics
Italian people of Ghanaian descent
Italian sportspeople of African descent
Sportspeople from Brescia